Carl Sylvester "Buster" Smith (January 26, 1921 – October 8, 1992) was an eleven-time "Top Master" in the American Pool Checkers Association Division Championship. He won the Top Master title in 1967, 1970, 1972–76, 1982–83, 1991, and 1992, and Master in 1968 and 1969.

He began playing in his native Chicago and was citywide champion by 17. He remained Chicago's best player until his death in 1992. He did not play for money, and made his living working at the post office.

In 1968, 1972, 1976, and 1978, Carl Smith participated in the World Championships for the international draughts variant. His highest placement was 5th in 1976.

Web sources

External links 
New York Times article that mentions him
 Chicago Reader

People from Chicago
Pool checkers players
American checkers players
1921 births
1992 deaths
Players of international draughts